Banksia Gully is a watercourse in Western Australia, nominally located at 32° 24' S 116° 10' E, about 10 kilometres (6 mi) south east of Jarrahdale in the Shire of Serpentine-Jarrahdale. It is about two kilometres (1.2 mi) long, and empties into the reservoir of Serpentine Dam.

References
 Banksia Gully in the Gazetteer of Australia

Watercourses of Western Australia